Prosper Brandsteert was a Belgian footballer. He played in one match for the Belgium national football team in 1905.

References

External links
 

Year of birth missing
Year of death missing
Belgian footballers
Belgium international footballers
Place of birth missing
Date of birth missing
Date of death missing
Association football midfielders